Saba Azarpeik is an Iranian journalist associated with the Iranian reformist movement.

2014 arrest
On 28 May 2014, Iranian security forces arrested Azarpeik at the Tehran offices of Tejarat-e-Farda, a pro-reform weekly where she had been working.

She is reportedly being held in Ward 2-A of Evin Prison and has been charged with "propaganda against the state" and "dissemination of falsehoods."

After 85 days in prison (solitary confinement), on 20 August, she was finally released on bail.

References

Living people
Iranian women journalists
Iranian prisoners and detainees
Place of birth missing (living people)
Year of birth missing (living people)